Graminella nigrifrons, the black-faced leafhopper, is a species of leafhopper in the family Cicadellidae.

References

Further reading

External links

 

Deltocephalinae
Insects described in 1885